Fritz Hagmann (28 March 1901 – 14 December 1974) was a Swiss freestyle wrestler and Olympic champion. He won a gold medal at the 1924 Summer Olympics in Paris.

Beside that he was a successful Schwinger and member of the Schwingklub Winterthur. But he could never win the Eidgenössische Schwing- und Älplerfest, closest to the win he was in 1927, where he made a draw in the final round against Ernst Kyburz. But in the same year he won the first edition of the Kilchsberger Schwinget, which is after the Eidgenössisches Schwing- und Älplerfest the most important competition.

References

External links

1901 births
1974 deaths
Swiss wrestlers
Wrestlers at the 1924 Summer Olympics
Swiss male sport wrestlers
Olympic gold medalists for Switzerland
Olympic medalists in wrestling
Medalists at the 1924 Summer Olympics
20th-century Swiss people